Tah Darreh (also known as Darband and Seh Darreh) is a village in Darram Rural District, in the Central District of Tarom County, Zanjan Province, Iran. At the 2006 census, its population was 197, in 48 families.

References 

Populated places in Tarom County